Hydroginella bullata is a species of sea snail, a marine gastropod mollusc in the family Marginellidae, the margin snails.

Description
The length of the shell attains 4.65 mm.

Distribution
This species occurs off Fiji.

References

 Boyer F., Wakefield A. & McCleery T. 2003. The genus Hydroginella (Caenogastropoda: Marginellidae) at bathyal levels from the Fiji Islands. Novapex 4 (2-3): 67-77

Marginellidae
Gastropods described in 2003